Valkendorfs Kollegium is a dormitory located in Sankt Peders Stræde in Copenhagen, Denmark. With a history that dates back to 1589, it is the oldest dormitory in Scandinavia.

History

The dormitory was founded on 26 February 1589 by the nobleman Christopher Valkendorf. The building he purchased was originally a monastery. The dormitory suffered a great deal during the Great Fire of Copenhagen in 1728. Though most of the brickwork survived, the building was rendered uninhabitable for several years.

The old building which never fully recovered from the fire was eventually torn down and a new building (which is still in use) was made and taken into use in 1866. Valkendorfs Kollegium is one of the old dormitories of the University of Copenhagen.

Residents
Several celebrities have been alumni of the dormitories through time. Among the best known include

References
 Valkendorfs Kollegium 1939–89 by Karen Marie Breindahl and Thomas Frank Moller.

External links
Homepage in Danish
 Source

1589 establishments in Europe
University of Copenhagen
University and college residential buildings in Copenhagen
16th-century establishments in Denmark
Buildings and structures associated with the Valkendorf family